Douglas Mackinnon is a Scottish film and television director from Portree, Isle of Skye.

He has directed many episodes of television drama and at least three television films.  His work includes Bodies, Gentlemen's Relish, Robin Hood, The Vice and numerous episodes of Doctor Who.

He also directed all six episodes of Terry Pratchett and Neil Gaiman's Good Omens.

Early life 
Mackinnon attended Portree High School on the Isle of Skye between 1967 and 1980. He then attended the National Film and Television School between 1985 - 1990.

Career

Film and television director 
Mackinnon directed the music video for The Proclaimers' song "Letter from America" in 1987. He then created the documentary series Home about the Isle of Skye. This series captured Skye Camanachd winning the Camanachd Cup in 1990.  In the 1990s, he directed episodes of several television drama series, including The Bill, Soldier Soldier and London's Burning.

He made his feature film directorial debut with The Flying Scotsman (2006), which was the gala premiere at the Edinburgh Festival in 2006 and was consequently picked up for worldwide distribution by MGM. He then went on to direct the first three episodes of Jekyll (2007) starring James Nesbitt, Michelle Ryan and Gina Bellman.  The show had nominations in the Emmy's and the Rose D'or for James Nesbitt.

He worked on eight episodes of the BBC's long-running sci-fi series Doctor Who between 2008 and 2015. He returned to work for the BBC to direct five episodes of the award-winning television series Line of Duty between 2012 and 2014. He then went on to direct a one-off episode of Sherlock, "The Abominable Bride", which won the Primetime Emmy Award for Outstanding Television Movie, for the BBC in 2016.

Mackinnon was the lead Director and Executive Producer on Knightfall, a major new drama series for the History Channel/A&E Network, between 2016 and 2017. He also worked as a director on two episodes of the TV series Outlander in 2016.

In 2017 Douglas was a director and executive producer of an adaption of Good Omens by Neil Gaiman and Terry Pratchett. It starred Michael Sheen and David Tennant and was created for Amazon and the BBC. All episodes were released on Amazon Prime Video on May 31, 2019, and aired weekly on BBC Two in the UK between January 15 and February 19, 2020. Among other accolades, the television series won the Ray Bradbury Award for Outstanding Dramatic Presentation at the Nebula Awards.

Other Occupations 
Douglas worked as a report author for the Scottish Government between July 2009 and September 2009 and reported on the state of the Scottish television production sector for the Culture minister.

Douglas was a committee member of BAFTA in Scotland between August 2010 and August 2011 and a committee member of the Scottish Screen Academy between June 2009 and June 2012

Selected television directing credits

References

External links

Year of birth missing (living people)
Living people
British film directors
British television directors
Hugo Award winners
People from the Isle of Skye
People educated at Portree High School